Matt Monger (born November 15, 1961) is a former American football linebacker. He played for the New York Jets from 1985 to 1987 and for the Buffalo Bills from 1989 to 1990.

References

1961 births
Living people
American football linebackers
Oklahoma State Cowboys football players
New York Jets players
Buffalo Bills players